Subject to Change is the debut album by the Ohio nu metal band Switched. It was released on February 26, 2002 via Immortal Records and went on to sell over 40,000 copies in US.

On January 10, 2006 the album was re-released. This revised version, released on January 10, 2006 via Corporate Punishment Records contains four bonus tracks and two enhanced music videos for the single "Inside".

Track listing
All songs written by Ben Schigel.
 "Inside" – 3:50
 "Four Walls" – 4:22
 "Walk Away" – 2:56
 "Religion" – 5:20
 "10 Dead Fingers" – 3:24
 "Reflections" – 3:39
 "Anymore" – 3:44
 "Skins" – 3:34
 "Wrongside" – 3:39
 "Last Chance" – 4:02
 "Exterminate" – 3:40
 "Darkening Days" – 3:39

Re-release
 "Spread" – 3:42
 "Walkaway" (Howard Benson Mix) – 3:01
 "Inside" (Howard Benson Mix) – 3:11
 "Inside" (Rick Will Mix) – 3:28
 Note: Tracks 13-15 are bonus tracks, which did not appear on the album's original version. track 16 was originally on the same track as "Darkening Days" as a hidden song with prolonged silence separating the two.

Personnel
 Ben Schigel - Vocals
 Brad Kochmit - Guitar
 Joe Schigel - Guitar
 Chad Szeliga - Drums
 Shawn May - Bass
 Jason French - Bass (for "Walk Away" only)

References

2002 debut albums
Switched (band) albums
Immortal Records albums